Robert Ljubičić (born 14 July 1999) is an Austrian footballer who plays for HNL club Dinamo Zagreb.

Club career
After three full seasons at St. Pölten in the Austrian Bundesliga, it was announced on 8 March 2021 that Ljubičić would join Rapid Wien in the summer of 2021 on a three-year deal. His brother, Dejan, was captain of the club at the time, but his departure to Köln in Germany was announced in April. He made his debut at Rapid in the second qualifying round of the UEFA Champions League against Sparta Prague on 20 July, in his brother's position of central midfield.

On 13 June 2022, HNL club Dinamo Zagreb announced the signing of Ljubičić. On 11 October 2022, he scored his first Champions League goal in a 1–1 draw against Red Bull Salzburg.

International career
Ljubičić is of Bosnian Croat descent, so he was eligible to represent Austria, Bosnia and Herzegovina and Croatia. He was capped for the Croatia U20 team in 2019, but decided to switch allegiances to Austria U21 team in 2020. He has not made a senior international debut for either country as of August 2021.

In November 2022, Ljubičić opted to represent Croatia instead of Austria.

Personal life
His older brother Dejan is also a professional footballer. They were born in Austria to Bosnian Croat parents from Busovača.

Career statistics

References

External links
 

1999 births
Living people
Footballers from Vienna
Citizens of Croatia through descent
Austrian people of Croatian descent
Austrian people of Bosnia and Herzegovina descent
Association football midfielders
Austrian footballers
Austria under-21 international footballers
Croatian footballers
Croatia youth international footballers
SKN St. Pölten players
SK Rapid Wien players
GNK Dinamo Zagreb players
Austrian Football Bundesliga players
Croatian Football League players
Austrian expatriate footballers
Expatriate footballers in Croatia
Austrian expatriate sportspeople in Croatia